Wallersteiner v Moir (No 2) [1975] QB 373 is a UK company law case, concerning the rules to bring a derivative claim. The updated law, which replaced the exceptions and the rule in Foss v Harbottle, is now contained in the Companies Act 2006 sections 260-264, but the case remains an example of the likely result in the old and new law alike.

This case followed on from a previous decision, Wallersteiner v Moir, that concerned piercing the corporate veil.

Facts
Mr Moir, a minority shareholder, in the course of an ongoing battle over a company owned Dr Wallersteiner, applied for money to continue a claim against Dr Wallersteiner for fraud. Dr Wallersteiner had bought a company called Hartley Baird Ltd using money from the company itself, in contravention of the prohibitions on financial assistance (under Companies Act 1948 s 54 and 190). He had got 80% of the company. Mr Moir was one of the 20% remainder shareholders. Wanting to expose Dr Wallersteiner’s various dealings, he circulated a letter to shareholders. Dr Wallersteiner sued for libel.

Mr Moir counterclaimed, and joined two of his companies as defendants, for £500,000 to be repaid. In a first judgment (Wallersteiner v Moir) the Court of Appeal held that the libel action would be struck out for deliberate delay and awarded £235,000 in damages to Mr Moir, but gave Dr Wallersteiner leave to defend the remaining issues, including fraud. Dr Wallersteiner claimed that interest could not be awarded under Law Reform (Miscellaneous Provisions) Act 1934. As this was going on, Mr Moir  was running out of money and made an application for funds to continue the action.

Judgment
The Court of Appeal held, after noting that interest was awardable under the court's equitable jurisdiction, that Mr Moir could be indemnified by the company for his costs. Since the derivative claim meant the company was proceeding against Dr Wallersteiner, Mr Moir was ineligible for legal aid. Moreover, contingency fee arrangements with Mr Moir's lawyers could not be sanctioned (although Lord Denning MR opined that public policy might approve it in some derivative claims). Hence, the costs of litigation for minority shareholders would be indemnified by the company.

On the problem of a derivative claim, and the question of funding by the company, Lord Denning MR said the following.

See also 
 UK company law
Littlewoods Mail Order Stores v IRC [1969] 1 WLR 1241

Notes

References 

United Kingdom company case law
Court of Appeal (England and Wales) cases
1974 in case law
1974 in British law
Lord Denning cases